Nathan Hinkle is a former American football coach.  He served as the 29th head football coach at Doane College in Crete, Nebraska and he held that position for the 1980 season.  His coaching record at Doane was 4–6.

Head coaching record

References

Year of birth missing (living people)
Living people
Doane Tigers football coaches